Grandma's Boy may refer to:

Grandma's Boy (1922 film)
Grandma's Boy (2006 film)